Heiko Herrlich (born 3 December 1971) is a German football manager and former player who played as a striker. He last managed FC Augsburg.

Club career
Herrlich played 258 matches (1989–2004) in the Bundesliga and scored 75 goals for Bayer 04 Leverkusen, Borussia Mönchengladbach and Borussia Dortmund. With Borussia Dortmund he won the German championship in 1996 and 2002, the Champions League and the Intercontinental Cup in 1997. With Borussia Mönchengladbach he won the DFB-Pokal in 1995, which he had also won in 1993 with Bayer Leverkusen.

In autumn 2000, it was discovered that he had a malignant brain tumor. He was successfully treated with radiation therapy and returned to Bundesliga action 2001 but was not able to return to his former glory as a player. He ended his professional career in 2004 after several injuries.

International career
In 1995, Herrlich played five matches for the Germany national team, all in qualifying matches for UEFA Euro 1996. He scored once, against Wales, but missed the final tournament, which Germany won, due to injury.

Coaching career
Herrlich received his coaching license in 2005 and began coaching the youth team of Borussia Dortmund. He also became the German spokesman for the 2006 INAS World Football Championships.

In July 2007, he was appointed as coach of the Germany U-17 team and won third place at the 2007 FIFA Under-17 World Cup in South Korea. On 27 October 2009, he was released from the German Football Association. He became later the head coach of VfL Bochum between 27 October 2009 and 29 April 2010. He finished with a record of four wins, eight draws, and 10 losses.

At the beginning of the 2011–12 season, he was named new manager of SpVgg Unterhaching. He left the club on 25 May 2012 for personal reasons. He finished with a record of 13 wins, eight draws, and 19 losses.

On 21 June 2013, he became the manager for the Bayern Munich U-17 team. In June 2015, Bayern Munich restructured their youth department and Herrlich left Munich.

On 20 December 2015, he took over Jahn Regensburg. His contract was scheduled to run up to the end of the 2015–16 season, with an extension for another year if the Jahn achieved promotion to the 3. Liga. The Ratisbon based club achieved back to back promotions under Herrlich's reign, returning to 2.Liga at the end of the 2016–17 season.

On 9 June 2017, it was announced that Herrlich will return to Leverkusen as new head coach.

On 23 December 2018, Bayer Leverkusen announced they would be parting ways with Herrlich, citing bad tactics and poor overall performance.

He was appointed as the new head coach of FC Augsburg on 10 March 2020. On 26 April 2021, he was sacked.

Career statistics

Club

International
Score and result list Germany's goal tally first, score column indicates score after Herrlich goal.

Managerial

Honours

As a player
Bayer Leverkusen
 DFB-Pokal: 1992–93

Borussia Mönchengladbach
 DFB-Pokal: 1994–95

Borussia Dortmund
 Bundesliga: 1995–96, 2001–02
 UEFA Champions League: 1996–97
 Intercontinental Cup: 1997
 UEFA Cup runner-up: 2001–02
 UEFA Super Cup runner-up: 1997

Individual
 Bundesliga Top Scorer: 1994–95 (joint with Mario Basler)

As a coach
Germany U17
 FIFA Under-17 World Cup third place: 2007

Individual
Best Under 17 Coach: 2008

References

External links

1971 births
Living people
Bayer 04 Leverkusen players
Borussia Dortmund players
Borussia Mönchengladbach players
Bundesliga players
Association football forwards
German football managers
VfL Bochum managers
SpVgg Unterhaching managers
FC Bayern Munich non-playing staff
German footballers
Germany international footballers
Germany under-21 international footballers
Kicker-Torjägerkanone Award winners
Bundesliga managers
3. Liga managers
SSV Jahn Regensburg managers
Bayer 04 Leverkusen managers
FC Augsburg managers
FC Emmendingen players
UEFA Champions League winning players
Footballers from Mannheim
West German footballers